KP may refer to:

Businesses and organizations
 Komsomolskaya Pravda, a daily Russian newspaper
 KP (newspaper), a Ukrainian newspaper
 KP Snacks, a United Kingdom food manufacturer
 Kaiser Permanente, a U.S. health maintenance organization
 Kerala Police, the law enforcement agency for the state of Kerala, India
 Kings Point, the US Merchant Marine Academy
 Communist Party (Serbia), the communist party of Serbia

People
 Kawan Prather, American record executive
 Kevin Pietersen, English cricketer
 Ko Wen-je, Taiwanese politician, physician and professor
 KP Sharma Oli, Nepalese politician and current Prime Minister of Nepal
 Kumaran Pathmanathan, member of the LTTE
 Kristaps Porzingis, Latvian basketball player
 Krishnaprasad, Resides at Thrissur

Places
 Khyber Pakhtunkhwa, a province in Pakistan 
 North Korea (ISO 3166 country code KP)
 Kensington Palace, office and residence of some of the British royal family

In science, technology, and mathematics
 .kp, the Internet domain name for North Korea
 KP-bil, or Terrängbil m/42 KP, a Swedish armoured vehicle
 Kadomtsev–Petviashvili equation, describing waves
 Keratosis pilaris, a human genetic disorder, also known as "chicken skin"
 keratic precipitate, an inflammatory cellular deposit on the cornea of the eye
 Kilogram-force ("kilopond"), a unit measure of force
 Kilopascal (kP), a unit of pressure
 Kilopixel (1,000 pixels), a measure of image resolution
 KP, the equilibrium constant expressed in terms of partial pressures
 Kp index, a measure of the global average geomagnetic potential
 Kripke–Platek set theory, a mathematical axiom system
 Pentax KP, a 2017 digital SLR camera
 Kernel panic, a computer stopping in response to an unrecoverable error
 k·p perturbation theory, for calculating properties of crystalline solids

Other uses
 KP, a recording released by American performer Kyle Patrick
 Kp (digraph), in written language
 KP duty "kitchen police" or "kitchen patrol", U.S. military slang for mess-hall duties
 Knight of the Order of St. Patrick (postnomial KP)
 Kim Possible, American animated television series

See also
 KP4 (disambiguation)